"Family Affair" is the twenty-fourth episode, serving as the season finale of the twelfth season of the American medical drama television series Grey's Anatomy, and is the 269th overall episode, which aired on ABC on May 19, 2016. The episode was written by William Harper and directed by Debbie Allen. At the time of its initial release, the episode was watched by 8.19 million viewers and was well received among  television critics. The episode marked the last appearance of longtime cast member Sara Ramirez, who played Callie Torres since the second season. Ramirez announced their departure from the series stating that she was “taking some welcome time off” as their character moved to New York City with her daughter.

Grey's Anatomy follows groups of physicians as they struggle to balance their professional and personal lives. "Family Affair" features the wedding of Amelia Shepherd (Caterina Scorsone) and Owen Hunt (Kevin McKidd). Meredith Grey (Ellen Pompeo) and Maggie Pierce (Kelly McCreary) support Amelia on her wedding day. Jo Wilson (Camilla Luddington) reveals that she has been keeping secrets from Alex Karev (Justin Chambers) while Arizona Robbins (Jessica Capshaw) and Callie Torres (Sara Ramirez) deal with the impact of their custody arrangement. Meanwhile, Ben Warren (Jason George) performs an emergency C-section on April Kepner (Sarah Drew) at Meredith's house.

Plot
On Owen and Amelia’s wedding day, Amelia has doubts about the marriage after Meredith talks to Owen about Cristina. Meredith confides with Amelia, leading them to run away with Maggie. April is serving as Owen’s best man, but when she forgets the ring, she and Ben run back to Meredith’s house to get it. As her contractions get closer together, Ben must step up and deliver the baby with an emergency C-section. Alex and Jo fight over Jo not wanting to marry him, leading him to storm out, and her getting drunk at Joe's bar. Andrew takes her home where she reveals to already being married, but is afraid of the guy. Alex walks in on Andrew helping Jo, in which he misunderstands and punches Andrew. Amelia makes it back to the wedding and marries Owen. Ben is able to save both April and her daughter's lives, while Arizona makes amends with Callie and allows her to move with Penny and share custody of Sofia. As Nathan is looking at Meredith, Maggie confides with her that she really likes Nathan, which shocks Meredith.

Production

The episode marked the last appearance for long-time cast member Sara Ramirez who played Dr. Callie Torres on the series since 2006. Her character was involved in a custody battle with ex-wife Dr. Arizona Robbins, played by Jessica Capshaw, which led to the former's move to New York City from Seattle. On May 19, in a note posted on Twitter after the season finale, Ramirez wrote that she was “taking some welcome time off”. Rhimes replied to the tweet by saying, “I will miss Callie tremendously, but am excited for what the future holds for Sara. She will always have a home at Shondaland.” Later, speaking at the Vulture Festival in New York City on May 22, Rhimes, told that she didn't know that Ramirez was leaving until they had shot the finale. She addressed Callie’s send-off and said, “This one was different because it wasn’t a big planned thing, I had a different plan going and when Sara came in and said, ‘I really need to take this break,’ I was lucky that we’d shot the end of the season with her going to New York City.”

Reception

Ratings
"Family Affair" was originally broadcast on May 19, 2016 on American Broadcasting Company (ABC) in the United States. It served as the season finale for the twelfth season of the show. On its initial release the episode was watched by a total of 8.19 million viewers and scored a 2.3/9 in the key 18-49 demographic in the Nielsen ratings, which was an increase from the previous episode "At Last" watched by 7.77 million viewers and received a 2.1/8 ratings/share. The episode was ranked 12th in overall viewership rank and 4th in 18-49 demographic. The episode was also the second-most watched drama of the night.

Critical reception
The finale was well received by television critics. It was given an A grade by The A.V. Club which declared the season overall as "phenomenal".

References

External links
 

Grey's Anatomy (season 12) episodes
2016 American television episodes
Television episodes about weddings